are New Zealand citizens of Japanese ancestry, which may include Japanese immigrants and descendants born in New Zealand. Japanese people first began immigrating to New Zealand in the 1890s. Until 1920, 14 Japanese citizens resided in New Zealand. Japanese immigration was halted during the period of the Pacific War and recommenced around the 1950s. From this period onwards, Japanese immigration remained small until the 1990s. In 1997, Japanese peoples were the 19th-largest ethnic group in New Zealand. , 18,141 New Zealand residents identify themselves as Japanese New Zealanders.

Demographics
In the 2018 census, 18,141 New Zealand residents identified themselves as members of the Japanese ethnic group. Of this number, the median age was 28.6 years. Females made up the majority (11,295), compared to males (6,849). Historians note that the higher proportion of women can be attributed to a larger number of Japanese women in mixed relationships with New Zealand citizens than Japanese men. Japanese women are also more likely to move to New Zealand for working holiday or study purposes. Auckland had the largest population of Japanese residents (46.7%), followed by Canterbury (17.4%) and Otago (6.5%). 67.9% of residents of Japanese ethnicity belonged to only one ethnic group; 25.9% belonged to two ethnic groups. 30.1% of Japanese residents were born in New Zealand, while 69.9% were born overseas. 66.4% of these overseas born residents were born in Asia. In the 2013 census, 10,269 residents were born in Japan.

In the 2018 census, 88.4% of residents of Japanese ethnicity spoke English, while 61.6% spoke two languages. Most residents of Japanese ethnicity held no religious affiliation (73.7%); 8.2% identified as Buddhist, 9.9% identified as Christian, and 2.8% identified as belonging to other religious groups, beliefs or philosophies.

The most common professions for Japanese in New Zealand were professionals (20.3%), community and personal service workers (18.4%) and technicians and trade workers (13.7%). 40.3% of Japanese in New Zealand reported full-time employment. 39.9% of Japanese in New Zealand were currently studying.

History 
Japanese immigration to New Zealand first began in the 1890s. The first Japanese settler arrived at Bluff on the South Island of New Zealand. One of the first Japanese nationals to become a citizen of New Zealand was Kazuyuki Tsukigawa in 1907. Prior to the beginning of Japanese immigration to New Zealand, most who arrived from Japan were short term visitors for diplomatic or cultural exploration reasons. New Zealand maintained strict immigration policies on non-European immigrants between the late 19th century to the early 20th century. Exceptions included Japanese who were married to or had parents who were New Zealand residents. 

During the Meiji Restoration of Japan, beginning in 1868, opportunities for exploration of Western nations including New Zealand were introduced, following the end of Japan's 250-year policy of seclusion. In 1874, some of the first Japanese visitors to New Zealand included a Japanese circus troupe. From 1882 to 1930, Japanese naval ships made visits to New Zealand, offering tours of the ships to New Zealanders. 

In 1920, 14 Japanese citizens resided in New Zealand. During this period, 10 Japanese immigrants had so far chosen to take up New Zealand citizenship. In 1931, the first Japanese student to study in New Zealand arrived.

As more Japanese visitors and immigrants began to arrive, so too did Japanese trade and business. While immigration increased, there was still hesitation from some New Zealanders towards the influx of Asian immigration. Japanese people typically chose to adopt English names upon immigrating to New Zealand to integrate better.

Upon Japan's entry into World War II, Japanese immigration and tourism began to slow. Japanese businesses and institutions, such as the Japanese Consulate, closed their doors, as hostility towards Japanese immigrants mounted. Following the bombing of Pearl Harbour, Japanese immigrants were typically imprisoned on Somes Island, or at a prisoner of war camp in Featherston. In 1942, 8,000 Japanese were interned at Featherston. Several Japanese prisoners of war were killed or wounded in skirmishes at these camps. A strike against forced labour at Featherston on 25 February 1943 resulted in the deaths of 48 Japanese prisoners and one guard. A joint memorial garden between Japan and New Zealand now stands at the site.

A diplomatic relationship between Japan and New Zealand was re-established in 1952. Relationships were re-established and Japanese culture became a major export of interests to New Zealanders.

During the 1950s and 1960s, a group of 50 Japanese women emigrated to New Zealand as Japanese war brides. These women had fallen in love with New Zealand soldiers who were stationed in Japan as part of the Occupational Forces post-World War II. These women faced difficulties in adjusting to life in New Zealand, including a lack of local community pressure to assimilate, and disapproval from their families for having married foreigners and moved away.

Immigration and tourism 
Japanese immigration to New Zealand remained small until the 1990s. Between 1976 to 1986, the number of Japanese residents in New Zealand increased from 1,245 to 1,791 people. Prior to 1980, there were no established Japanese migrant communities in New Zealand. Until this period, only small numbers of Japanese citizens were admitted into New Zealand. During the mid-1990s, working holiday schemes were opened for Japanese citizens in New Zealand as a result of reformed immigration policies. Immigration policies began to promote the immigration of Japanese citizens with skilled job qualifications. This led to an increase in younger professionals arriving as short-term immigrants. The introduction of new immigration opportunities led to a large increase in Japanese immigration to New Zealand. Japanese communities, supplementary schools, societies and businesses developed.

Between 1991 to 2001, the Japanese population in New Zealand increased from 2,970 people to 10,000 people, 3.4 times the size of the Japanese population in 1991. In 1997, those of Japanese ethnicity made up 0.21% of New Zealand's population. Academics also attribute this rapid increase in population size to the expansion of tourism and education for Japanese citizens from the late 1980s. The Immigration Act of 1991 can also be credited for the increase in Japanese immigration. The Act led to an increase in immigrants of various ethnicities and backgrounds, with a more multicultural view of immigration.

In 1997, 162,736 Japanese tourists visited New Zealand, constituting 10.5% of New Zealand's annual foreign visitors. Japanese immigration has continued to rise since the 1990s, with a population of 18,141 in 2018. This steady increase is often credited to the Westernisation of Japanese culture, as well as the globalisation of European New Zealander culture. This has made it easier for Japanese people to acclimate to life in New Zealand. Historians also note that a large reason for Japanese immigration to New Zealand is familial ties, such as spouses, partners or immediate family of New Zealand descent. In 1997, 56.3% of Japanese applicants for permanent residency in New Zealand applied under the Family category.

Geographic placement 
Large groups of Japanese communities can be found in the cities of Auckland, Christchurch, Wellington, and Dunedin.

Auckland 
The majority of Japanese New Zealanders reside in Auckland. In 1997, 41.8% of Japanese residents lived in Auckland. Japanese immigration to Auckland began because of short-term business expatriates transferred primarily to Japanese company locations in Auckland. The immigration of these short-term business expatriates led to the creation of a wider Japanese community in Auckland. Located in Auckland is the Auckland Japanese Supplementary School, the New Zealand-Japan Society of Auckland, and the Auckland Japanese Christian Church. Japanese New Zealanders in Auckland typically reside in the Eastern suburbs. Many short-term Japanese residents in Auckland have created smaller Japanese enclaves within Auckland.

Christchurch/Canterbury 
The Japanese community of Christchurch developed an informal community in the 1980s. In 1992, the Japanese Society of Canterbury was created, with the aim of assisting Japanese immigrants in integrating into New Zealand society, and providing cultural and social opportunities. The Society also distributes a quarterly newspaper, The Japanese Society of Canterbury Newspaper. The newspaper is also utilised by the Japanese Government to communicate with Japanese New Zealanders. In 1997, 21% of Japanese citizens in New Zealand resided in Canterbury. , 2,568 Japanese residents resided in Canterbury.

Wellington 

In 2013, 1,164 Japanese residents lived in Wellington. The city once housed a Japan's Seamen's Hall, which was a recreational hall for Japanese male immigrants living in Wellington. Currently, Wellington also hosts an annual 'Japan Festival Wellington'. The festival celebrates the relationship between Japan, Wellington and Wellington's Japanese sister city, Sakai. Located in Wellington is the Japanese Society of Wellington, which promotes Japanese culture in New Zealand. Also in Wellington is the ' choir', with at least 60 members. The choir acts as a support system for Japanese New Zealanders. The group is also involved in cultural events within Wellington.

Hawke's Bay 
Hawke's Bay is home to the Japan Society of Hawke's Bay. The society was founded in 1961. The society was founded after a local resident decided to form a community group between locals and Japanese immigrants. The society runs Japanese culture focused events, as well as Japanese Conversation classes.

Education

Japanese-language schools were first established in New Zealand to allow the children of Japanese business expatriates the opportunity to continue learning the Japanese school curriculum while living in New Zealand. Full-time Japanese curriculum schools and part-time Japanese supplementary schools were opened. The first supplementary school was opened in 1972 in Auckland. The students attended both local schools and supplementary schools to be able to integrate into the Japanese system once they returned to Japan. Originally, only the children of business expatriates were permitted entry; however, as demand grew, permanent residents were allowed entry.

The study of the Japanese language is also a popular choice in foreign languages in New Zealand. A 1993 survey found that 27,942 people were studying Japanese in New Zealand. At the time, New Zealand had the seventh-highest number of people studying Japanese in the world. Japanese language courses were first introduced to New Zealand's secondary and tertiary education systems in 1960.

There are weekend supplementary Japanese education programmes in Auckland, Canterbury/Christchurch, and Wellington. Japanese schools within New Zealand include:

  – Ilam School, Ilam, Christchurch
 
  – Crofton Downs, Wellington

Cultural impact 
The end of World War II marked the beginning of New Zealand's interest in the major exportation of Japanese culture. Since this period, the Japanese community of New Zealand has expanded to include formalised communities, organisations and cultural institutions. Examples include the Japanese Society of Canterbury, which opened in 1991.

There are currently 14 New Zealand-Japan societies and 32 sister cities. These organisations and communities were formed to provide a bridge between Japanese New Zealander's Japanese heritage and their lives in New Zealand. Ayami Kuragasaki-Laughton writes that Japanese New Zealanders have "dual loyalty to the land of their birth and the place where they live."

Japanese New Zealander community-run organisations often host clubs aimed at introducing Japanese culture to New Zealanders.

Traditional art styles in New Zealand have also been influenced by Japanese traditions. New Zealand pottery techniques have been influenced by Japanese potters such as Shōji Hamada, who was one of several potters who made visits to New Zealand from Japan.

 became popular in New Zealand during the 1960s and 1970s. Introduced during cultural visits by Japanese experts, it led to the creation of  societies in New Zealand, such as  Wellington. 

Japanese popular culture such as manga and anime have also become popular in New Zealand, through younger generations. New Zealand currently hosts an annual anime and manga convention, 'Overload', for New Zealander anime and manga fans. A community of cosplayers and cosplay enthusiasts has also developed in New Zealand due to the growing popularity of Japanese popular culture.

Japanese forms of martial arts are a popular cultural export in New Zealand. Between 2007–2008 around 70,000 people in New Zealand practiced a martial art. Jujutsu was first introduced to New Zealand by touring jujutsu professionals from Japan. Jujutsu was first introduced as a form of entertainment to New Zealanders.

From the middle of the 20th century, judo became more commonly practised in New Zealand. Clubs for judo and karate in New Zealand were first created in the 1950s. A National Judo Championship was held in New Zealand in 1957. The first National Karate Championship was held in New Zealand in 1967. Over time, Westernised styles of Japanese martial arts have been created in New Zealand. Traditional forms of martial arts continue to gain popularity as well.

Notable individuals
 Jun Arita, graphic designer
 Michael Fitzgerald, professional footballer
 JAY'ED, singer-songwriter
 Shigeyuki Kihara, artist
 Ben McLachlan, professional tennis player
 Kazuyuki Kiyohei Tsukigawa, mariner and Salvation Army officer
 Kayne Vincent, professional footballer
 Anna Sawai, actress, dancer and singer, former member of Faky
Nicole Fujita, model and 
Mark de Clive-Lowe, DJ, musician, composer and producer 
Hannah O'Neill, ballet dancer

See also

 Immigration to New Zealand
 Japan–New Zealand relations

References

Further reading
 Shirakawa, Mineko. "EXPERIMENTAL STUDY OF MORPHOLOGICAL CASE MARKING KNOWLEDGE IN JAPANESE-ENGLISH BILINGUAL CHILDREN IN CHRISTCHURCH NEW ZEALAND" (Archive; master's degree thesis). University of Canterbury, 2013.

Asian New Zealander
New Zealand people of Japanese descent
Japan–New Zealand relations
New Zealanders
New Zealand
Oceania
Japanese expatriates in New Zealand